Air Vice-Marshal Tamara Nancy Jennings,  (born 27 August 1973) is a British solicitor and senior Royal Air Force officer. Since September 2018, she has served as Director of Legal Services and head of the RAF Legal Branch.

Early life
Jennings was born on 27 August 1973 in Akrotiri, Cyprus, the daughter of Nigel John Quincey and Janet Mary Quincey. She attended Kesteven and Sleaford High School and Lady Manners School. She received an LLB from the University of Northumbria at Newcastle and an MA from King's College London. She was admitted as a solicitor in July 1998, and went on to practice law in Newcastle upon Tyne.

RAF career
On 25 May 2000, Jennings was commissioned into the RAF Legal Branch of the Royal Air Force (RAF) with the rank of flight lieutenant. She moved from a short service to a permanent commission on 19 April 2004, allowing her to serve in the RAF until retirement. She was promoted to squadron leader on 25 May 2004, and to wing commander on 25 May 2010. She has work at HQ Personnel and Training Command, HQ Strike Command, RAF Brize Norton, and HQ Air Command.

In 2017, Jennings was promoted to air commodore. She served as Deputy Director Legal Services (RAF) from May 2017 to 2018. On 29 September 2018, she was appointed Director of Legal Services (RAF) and promoted to air vice-marshal.

In the 2015 Queen's Birthday Honours, Jennings was appointed an Officer of the Order of the British Empire (OBE). She was awarded the Royal Air Force Long Service and Good Conduct Medal in 2018.

References

 

 
 
 

1973 births
Living people
Alumni of King's College London
Royal Air Force air marshals
British solicitors
British women lawyers
Officers of the Order of the British Empire
Female air marshals of the Royal Air Force
Women in the Royal Air Force